Lawrence Augustine Phillips is an American judge and politician. He served as a Republican member for the 62nd district of the Texas House of Representatives.

Phillips attended Baylor University, where he earned his bachelor's degree. He then attended the University of Houston, where he earned his Juris Doctor degree. In 2003, Phillips won the 62nd district of the Texas House of Representatives. He succeeded Ron Clark. In 2018, Phillips was succeeded by Reggie Smith for the 62nd district.

Phillips served as a judge of the Texas District Courts for Grayson County, Texas since May 1, 2018.

References 

Living people
Place of birth missing (living people)
Year of birth missing (living people)
Republican Party members of the Texas House of Representatives
21st-century American politicians
County judges in Texas
Texas state court judges
21st-century American judges
Baylor University alumni
University of Houston alumni